Nationality words link to articles with information on the nation's poetry or literature (for instance, Irish or France).

Events
 The Southern Review, an American quarterly literary magazine, begins publication in Charleston, South Carolina, it champions Southern culture and literature (Another, unrelated, publication of the same name was started in 1935)
 John Neal, The Yankee magazine volume 1, the first substantial published criticism of poetry by John Greenleaf Whittier and Henry Wadsworth Longfellow

Works published

United Kingdom
 Edwin Atherstone, The Fall of Nineveh
 Laman Blanchard, Lyric Offerings
 William Lisle Bowles, Days Departed; or, Banwell Hill, a lay of the Severn Sea
 Mary Ann Browne, Ada, and Other Poems
 Thomas Campbell, The Poetical Works of Thomas Campbell
 Samuel Taylor Coleridge, The Poetical Works of S. T. Coleridge
 Felicia Hemans, Records of Women, with Other Poems
 John Gibson Lockhart, Life of Robert Burns, biography
 Robert Montgomery, The Omnipresence of the Deity
 Catherine Eliza Richardson, Poems
 Samuel Rogers, Italy: a Poem. Part the Second (Part the First published in 1822)
 Joseph Blanco White, "Night and Death"

United States
 Carlos Wilcox, Ramains, 14 sermons and two poems, "The Age of Benevolence" and "The Religion of Taste"
 Catharine Read Arnold Williams, Original Poems on Various Subjects, United States

Other
 Henry Louis Vivian Derozio, The Fakeer of Jungheera: A Metrical Tale and Other Poems, Calcutta: Samuel Smith and Co.; India, Indian poetry in English
 Adam Mickiewicz, Konrad Wallenrod, a long narrative poem set in 14th-century Lithuania; Poland
 Gérard de Nerval, translator, Faust, translation into French from the original German of Johann Wolfgang von Goethe's long poem; the work earned Nerval his reputation; it was praised by Goethe, and Hector Berlioz later used sections for his legend-symphony La Damnation de Faust
 Christian Winther, Traesnitt ("Woodcuts"); Denmark

Births
Death years link to the corresponding "[year] in poetry" article:
 February 12 – George Meredith (died 1909), English novelist and poet
 April 1 – Roderick Flanagan (died 1862), Irish-born Australian journalist, poet and historian
 May 12 – Dante Gabriel Rossetti (died 1882), English Pre-Raphaelite painter and poet
 May 25 – James McIntyre (died 1906), Scottish-born Canadian "Poet of Cheese"
 August 19 – Arthur Munby (died 1910), English diarist, poet, portrait photographer and lawyer
 September 15 – Dolores Cabrera y Heredia (died 1899), Spanish Romantic poet and novelist, member of Hermandad Lírica

Deaths
Birth years link to the corresponding "[year] in poetry" article:
 January 5 – Kobayashi Issa 小林一茶 (born 1763), Japanese poet and Buddhist priest known for his haiku poems and journals; widely regarded as one of the four haiku masters in Japan, along with Bashō, Buson and Shiki
 January 26 – Lady Caroline Lamb (born 1785), English aristocrat, novelist and poet
 April 11 – Edward Coote Pinkney (born 1802), English-born American poet, lawyer, sailor, professor and editor
 June 21 – Leandro Fernández de Moratín (born 1760), Spanish dramatist, translator and neoclassical poet
 September 26 – John Gardiner Calkins Brainard (born 1795), American lawyer, editor and poet
 date not known – Elizabeth Sophia Tomlins (born 1763), English novelist and occasional poet

See also

 Poetry
 List of years in poetry
 List of years in literature
 19th century in literature
 19th century in poetry
 Romantic poetry
 Golden Age of Russian Poetry (1800–1850)
 Weimar Classicism period in Germany, commonly considered to have begun in 1788  and to have ended either in 1805, with the death of Friedrich Schiller, or 1832, with the death of Goethe
 List of poets

Notes

19th-century poetry
Poetry